Love is a 2021 Russian romantic comedy film directed by Igor Tverdokhlebov. It was theatrically released in Russia on February 11, 2021 by KaroRental.

Plot 
The Love Hotel is the most beautiful place to spend Valentine's Day. And suddenly the former classmates gather there and the meeting reinforces their old feelings.

Cast

References 

2021 films
2020s Russian-language films
Russian romantic comedy films
2021 romantic comedy films